The Fiji and the Samoa national teams have played each other on fifty-four occasions, with Fiji winning thirty, Samoa twenty-one. They regularly play each other in the Pacific Nations Cup, with Fiji winning four times and Samoa winning five times in nine meetings.

During the early years of their encounters, they played in the South Pacific Championship and the Pacific-rim Championship with other Pacific nations. They would also play each other on a friendly home and away basis, but these matches would mostly be used for Rugby World Cup qualification. These two sides have only played each other once in a Rugby World Cup game, in the 2011 Rugby World Cup in New Zealand, where they played in the iconic Eden Park. Samoa won the match 27–7.

Summary
Note: Summary below reflects test results by both teams.

Overview

Records
Note: Date shown in brackets indicates when the record was or last set.

Results

XV Results
Below is a list of matches that Samoa has awarded matches test match status by virtue of awarding caps, but Fiji did not award caps.

Notes

References

Fiji national rugby union team matches
Samoa national rugby union team matches